Tomé Pires (1465?–1524 or 1540) was a Portuguese apothecary from Lisbon who spent 1512 to 1515 in Malacca immediately after the Portuguese conquest, at a time when Europeans were only first arriving in Southeast Asia. After his arduous experiences in India and the East Indies, he headed the first official embassy since the 14th century from a European nation in China (Portugal, to the Chinese Zhengde Emperor, during the Ming dynasty), where he died.

Pires was apothecary to the ill-fated Afonso, Prince of Portugal, son of King John II of Portugal. He went to India in 1511, invested as "factor of drugs", the Eastern commodities that were an important element of what is generally called "the spice trade". In Malacca and Cochin he avidly collected and documented information on the Malay-Indonesian area, and personally visited Java, Sumatra and Maluku.

The Suma Oriental 
From his Malay-Indonesia travels, he wrote a landmark book on Asian trade, the Suma Oriental que trata do Mar Roxo até aos Chins (Summa of the East, from the Red Sea up to the Chinese). He wrote the book in Malacca and India between 1512 and 1515, completing it before the death of Afonso de Albuquerque (December 1515).

It is the first European description of the Malay Archipelago and the oldest and most extensive description of the Portuguese East. It is a compilation of a wide variety of information:  historical, geographical, ethnographic, botanical, economic, commercial, etc., including coins, weights and measures. Pires was careful to investigate the accuracy of the information collected from merchants, sailors and others with whom he had contact. It shows him to be a discriminating observer, in spite of his tangled prose, but superior to other Portuguese writers of the time. The book, couched as a report to Manuel of Portugal, and perhaps fulfilling a commission undertaken before he left Lisbon, is regarded as one of the most conscientious first-hand resources for the study of the geography and trade of the Indies at that time, including one of the most important resources for the study of the contemporaneous Islam in Indonesia. Although it cannot be regarded as completely free of inaccuracies in its detail, it is remarkably consistent with evidence of the time and makes no fundamentally erroneous statements about the area. Its contemporary rival as a source is only the better-known book of Duarte Barbosa and, later Garcia de Orta.

The Suma Oriental, unpublished and presumed lost in an archive until 1944, also includes the first written account of the 'Spice Islands' of Banda in Maluku, the islands that first drew Europeans to Indonesia. In its detail "it was not surpassed, in many respects, for more than a century or two," its modern editor, Armando Cortesão, has asserted. Suma Oriental is represented by a long-lost manuscript in Paris. Four letters written by Pires survive, and there are a scattering of references to him by contemporaries, including a letter of Albuquerque to the King, 30 November 1513.

Pires mentioned several Tamil cities of Ceylon he visited on his travels in the manuscript, including Kali, Nigumbo, Celabão and Tenavarque, home to the renowned temple complex of Tenavarai.

1516 embassy to China 
In 1516, Tomé Pires went to Canton (Guangzhou) in the fleet of Fernão Pires de Andrade leading an embassy sent by king Manuel I to Zhengde Emperor of China. However, he was never received by the emperor, due to several setbacks, including the suspicion of the Chinese, and the plot moved by deposed sultan Mahmud Shah after the Portuguese conquest of Malacca in 1511. The embassy fell in disgrace, with some of its members killed starting a period of three decades of Portuguese persecution in China. Tomé Pires is said to have died of disease in 1524 in China, although some state he lived up to 1540 in Jiangsu, but without permission to leave China.

This was the first official embassy from a European nation to China after Giovanni de' Marignolli was sent as legate by the Papacy (in Beijing from 1342 to 1345).

See also
Fernão Pires de Andrade
Jorge Álvares
History of Indonesia

References

Citations

Bibliography

Luis Madureira. "Tropical Sex Fantasies and the Ambassador's Other Death: The Difference in Portuguese Colonialism," Cultural Critique (Number 28; Fall of 1994): 149–173.
Muller, Karl, and David Pickell (eds) (1997). Maluku: Indonesian Spice Islands. (Singapore: Periplus Editions), p. 86.
(Pires 1990) Armando Cortesão, The 'Suma Oriental' of Tomé Pires: An Account of the East, from the Red Sea to China, 2 vols., (1944) 1990. (A 2005 reprint of this book on Google Books)

 Albuquerque, L. “Tomé Pires”, in Dictionary of Scientific Biography. 1974. Vol. 10, p. 616.
 Cortesão, A. A propósito do ilustre boticário quinhentista Tomé Pires., Revista Portuguesa de Farmácia,  13,3 (1963), p. 298-307.

Further reading 
 Cortesão, A. A Suma Oriental de Tomé Pires e o Livro de Francisco Rodrigues. Coimbra, 1978. 
 Cortesão, A. Primeira embaixada europeia à China. o boticário e embaixador Tomé Pires. Lisboa, 1945.
 Dias, J. Lopes. Medicinas da 'Suma Oriental' de Tomé Pires. Porto, 1947. Sep. Jornal do Médico, vol. 9, n.º 208, pp. 76-83.
 Dias, J. P. Sousa. A Farmácia em Portugal. Uma introdução à sua história. 1338-1938. Lisboa: ANF, 1994.
 Loureiro, Rui M. O manuscrito de Lisboa da "Suma Oriental" de Tomé Pires (Contribuição para uma edição crítica). Macau: Instituto Português do Oriente, 1996.
  - letters from the survivors of the Pires' embassy, imprisoned in Canton. According to Cortesão's later research, the letters were actually written in 1524.

Portuguese explorers
Portuguese diplomats
Portuguese Renaissance writers
Portuguese travel writers
Portuguese expatriates in China
Ambassadors of Portugal to China
History of Malaysia
Portuguese colonialism in Indonesia
1460s births
16th-century deaths
16th-century explorers
Explorers of Indonesia
People from Lisbon
16th-century Portuguese people
15th-century Portuguese people
Date of death unknown